Voltlage is a municipality in the district of Osnabrück, in Lower Saxony, Germany.

Mayors
2001-2016: Bernhard Egbert
since 2016: Norbert Trame

Sons and daughters of the municipality of Voltlage

 Bernhard Heinrich Overberg (1748–1826), Roman Catholic theologian and pedagogue

References

External links
 

Osnabrück (district)